Edward Richard Woodham (20 February 1831 – 12 December 1886) was one of the survivors of the Charge of the Light Brigade on 25 October 1854 during the Crimean War.

As the "Chairman of the committee for the celebration", he organised a 21st Anniversary dinner for the survivors of the "Charge"  (at the Alexandra Palace in London), reported in detail in the Illustrated London News dated Saturday 30 October 1875. The senior commander surviving, Lord Lucan, was not present; the newspaper account suggests that he was not invited.

In the article, there were reproduced the recollections of a number of the survivors including those of Edward Richard Woodham.  The Hussars' museum has confirmed that Edward Richard Woodham had enlisted in the 11th Hussars in June 1847 and that after the "Charge" he had spent a short period in hospital. The Bristol Town Council archive office has confirmed that Edward Richard Woodham was born on 20 February 1831 and his father (a cooper) was born on 18 November 1798.  Both were born in Bristol and were baptised at St. Paul's Church in Bristol.

He died on the 12th December 1886, aged 55, and is buried on the east side of Highgate Cemetery (grave number 27283 in Square 121).

References
^ Dutton, Roy (2007). Forgotten Heroes: The Charge of the Light Brigade. InfoDial Ltd. .

 Illustrated London News 30 October 1875

External links
A Walk through Highgate Cemetery
Great-grandson Michael Julien's website

1831 births
1886 deaths
Burials at Highgate Cemetery
British Army personnel of the Crimean War